Tefnut is a deity of moisture, moist air, dew and rain in Ancient Egyptian religion. She is the sister and consort of the air god Shu and the mother of Geb and Nut.

Etymology
The name Tefnut has no certain etymology but it may be an onomatopoeia of the sound of spitting, as Atum spits her out in some versions of the creation myth. Additionally, her name was written as a mouth spitting in late texts.

Like most Egyptian deities, including her brother, Tefnut has no single ideograph or symbol. Her name in hieroglyphs consists of four single phonogram signs t-f-n-t.  Although the n phonogram is a representation of waves on the surface of water, it was never used as an ideogram or determinative for the word water (mw), or for anything associated with water.

Mythological origins

Tefnut is a daughter of the solar deity Ra-Atum. Married to her twin brother Shu, she is mother of Nut, the sky and Geb, the earth. Tefnut's grandchildren were Osiris, Isis, Set, Nephthys, and, in some versions, Horus the Elder. She was also the great-grandmother of Horus the Younger. Alongside her father, brother, children, grandchildren, and great-grandchild, she is a member of the Ennead of Heliopolis.

There are a number of variants to the myth of the creation of the twins Tefnut and Shu. In every version, Tefnut is the product of parthenogenesis, and all involve some variety of body fluid.

In the Heliopolitan creation myth, Atum sneezed to produce Tefnut and Shu. Pyramid Text 527 says, "Atum was creative in that he proceeded to sneeze while in Heliopolis. And brother and sister were born - that is Shu and Tefnut."

In some versions of this myth, Atum also spits out his saliva, which forms the act of procreation. This version contains a play on words, the tef sound which forms the first syllable of the name Tefnut also constitutes a word meaning "to spit" or "to expectorate".

The Coffin Texts contain references to Shu being sneezed out by Atum from his nose, and Tefnut being spat out like saliva. The Bremner-Rind Papyrus and the Memphite Theology describe Atum as sneezing out saliva to form the twins.

Iconography
Tefnut is a leonine deity, and appears as human with a lioness head when depicted as part of the Great Ennead of Heliopolis. The other frequent depiction is as a lioness, but Tefnut can also be depicted as fully human. In her fully or semi anthropomorphic form, she is depicted wearing a wig, topped either with a uraeus serpent, or a uraeus and solar disk, and she is sometimes depicted as a lion headed serpent. Her face is sometimes used in a double headed form with that of her brother Shu on collar counterpoises.

During the 18th and 19th Dynasties, particularly during the Amarna Period, Tefnut was depicted in human form wearing a low flat headdress, topped with sprouting plants. Akhenaten's mother, Tiye was depicted wearing a similar headdress, and identifying with Hathor-Tefnut. The iconic blue crown of Nefertiti is thought by archaeologist Joyce Tyldesley to be derived from Tiye's headdress, and may indicate that she was also identifying with Tefnut.

Cult centres
Heliopolis and Leontopolis (now ell el-Muqdam) were the primary cult centres. At Heliopolis, Tefnut was one of the members of that city's great Ennead, and is referred to in relation to the purification of the wabet (priest) as part of the temple rite. Here she had a sanctuary called the Lower Menset.

At Karnak, Tefnut formed part of the Ennead and was invoked in prayers for the health and wellbeing of the pharaoh.

She was worshiped with Shu as a pair of lions in Leontopolis in the Nile Delta.

Mythology
Tefnut was connected with other leonine goddesses as the Eye of Ra. As a lioness she could display a wrathful aspect and is said to have escaped to Nubia in a rage, jealous of her grandchildren's higher worship. Only after receiving the title "honorable" from Thoth, did she return. In the earlier Pyramid Texts she is said to produce pure waters from her vagina.

As Shu had forcibly separated his son Geb from his sister-wife Nut, Geb challenged his father Shu, causing the latter to withdraw from the world. Geb, who was in love with his mother Tefnut, takes her as his chief queen-consort.

References

External links
 

Egyptian goddesses
Fertility goddesses
Wind goddesses
Water goddesses
Rain deities
Animal goddesses
Personifications
Lion deities
Mythological rape victims